Ototoxicity is the property of being toxic to the ear (oto-), specifically the cochlea or auditory nerve and sometimes the vestibular system, for example, as a side effect of a drug. The effects of ototoxicity can be reversible and temporary, or irreversible and permanent. 
It has been recognized since the 19th century. 
There are many well-known ototoxic drugs used in clinical situations, and they are prescribed, despite the risk of hearing disorders, for very serious health conditions. 
Ototoxic drugs include antibiotics (such as gentamicin, streptomycin, tobramycin), loop diuretics (such as furosemide), and platinum-based chemotherapy agents (such as cisplatin and carboplatin). A number of nonsteroidal anti-inflammatory drugs (NSAIDS) have also been shown to be ototoxic. This can result in sensorineural hearing loss, dysequilibrium, or both. Some environmental and occupational chemicals have also been shown to affect the auditory system and interact with noise.

Signs and symptoms
Symptoms of ototoxicity include partial or profound hearing loss, vertigo, and tinnitus.

The cochlea is primarily a hearing structure situated in the inner ear. It is the snail-shaped shell containing several nerve endings that makes hearing possible.
Ototoxicity typically results when the inner ear is poisoned by medication that damages the cochlea, vestibule, semi-circular canals, or the auditory/ vestibulocochlear nerve. The damaged structure then produces the symptoms the patient presents with. Ototoxicity in the cochlea may cause hearing loss of the high-frequency pitch ranges or complete deafness, or losses at points between.  It may present with bilaterally symmetrical symptoms, or asymmetrically, with one ear developing the condition after the other or not at all. The time frames for progress of the disease vary greatly and symptoms of hearing loss may be temporary or permanent.

The vestibule and semi-circular canal are inner-ear components that comprise the vestibular system. Together they detect all directions of head movement. Two types of otolith organs are housed in the vestibule: the saccule, which points vertically and detects vertical acceleration, and the utricle, which points horizontally and detects horizontal acceleration. The otolith organs together sense the head's position with respect to gravity when the body is static; then the head's movement when it tilts; and pitch changes during any linear motion of the head. The saccule and utricle detect different motions, which information the brain receives and integrates to determine where the head is and how and where it is moving.

The semi-circular canals are three bony structures filled with fluid. As with the vestibule, the primary purpose of the canals is to detect movement. Each canal is oriented at right angles to the others, enabling detection of movement in any plane. The posterior canal detects rolling motion, or motion about the X axis; the anterior canal detects pitch, or motion about the Y axis; the horizontal canal detects yaw motion, or motion about the Z axis. 
When a medication is toxic in the vestibule or the semi-circular canals, the patient senses loss of balance or orientation rather than losses in hearing. Symptoms in these organs present as vertigo, difficulties walking in low light and darkness, disequilibrium, oscillopsia among others. Each of these problems is related to balance and the mind is confused with the direction of motion or lack of motion. Both the vestibule and semi-circular canals transmit information to the brain about movement; when these are poisoned, they are unable to function properly which results in miscommunication with the brain.

When the vestibule and/or semi-circular canals are affected by ototoxicity, the eye can also be affected. Nystagmus and oscillopsia are two conditions that overlap the vestibular and ocular systems. These symptoms cause the patient to have difficulties with seeing and processing images. The body subconsciously tries to compensate for the imbalance signals being sent to the brain by trying to obtain visual cues to support the information it is receiving. This results in that dizziness and "woozy" feeling patients use to describe conditions such as oscillopsia and vertigo.

Cranial nerve VIII is the least affected component of the ear when ototoxicity arises, but if the nerve is affected, the damage is most often permanent. Symptoms present similar to those resulting from vestibular and cochlear damage, including tinnitus, ringing of the ears, difficulty walking, deafness, and balance and orientation issues.

Ototoxic agents

Antibiotics
Antibiotics in the aminoglycoside class, such as gentamicin and tobramycin, may produce cochleotoxicity through a poorly understood mechanism. It may result from antibiotic binding to NMDA receptors in the cochlea and damaging neurons through excitotoxicity. Aminoglycoside-induced production of reactive oxygen species may also injure cells of the cochlea. Once-daily dosing and co-administration of N-acetylcysteine may protect against aminoglycoside-induced ototoxicity. The anti-bacterial activity of aminoglycoside compounds is due to inhibition of ribosome function and these compounds similarly inhibit protein synthesis by mitochondrial ribosomes because mitochondria evolved from a bacterial ancestor. Consequently, aminoglycoside effects on production of reactive oxygen species as well as dysregulation of cellular calcium ion homeostasis may result from disruption of mitochondrial function. Ototoxicity of gentamicin can be exploited to treat some individuals with Ménière's disease by destroying the inner ear,  which stops the vertigo attacks but causes permanent deafness.
Due to the effects on mitochondria, certain inherited mitochondrial disorders result in increased sensitivity to the toxic effects of aminoglycosides.

Macrolide antibiotics, including erythromycin, are associated with reversible ototoxic effects. The underlying mechanism of ototoxicity may be impairment of ion transport in the stria vascularis. Predisposing factors include renal impairment, hepatic impairment, and recent organ transplantation.

Loop diuretics
Certain types of diuretics are associated with varying levels of risk for ototoxicity. Loop and thiazide diuretics carry this side effect. The loop diuretic furosemide is associated with ototoxicity, particularly when doses exceed 240 mg per hour. The related compound ethacrynic acid has a higher association with ototoxicity, and is therefore used only in patients with sulfa allergies. Diuretics are thought to alter the ionic gradient within the stria vascularis. Bumetanide confers a decreased risk of ototoxicity compared to furosemide.

Chemotherapeutic agents
Platinum-containing chemotherapeutic agents, including cisplatin and carboplatin, are associated with cochleotoxicity characterized by progressive, high-frequency hearing loss with or without tinnitus (ringing in the ears). Ototoxicity is less frequently seen with the related compound oxaliplatin. The severity of cisplatin-induced ototoxicity is dependent upon the cumulative dose administered and the age of the patient, with young children being most susceptible. The exact mechanism of cisplatin ototoxicity is not known. The drug is understood to damage multiple regions of the cochlea, causing the death of outer hair cells, as well as damage to the spiral ganglion neurons and cells of the stria vascularis. Long-term retention of cisplatin in the cochlea may contribute to the drug's cochleotoxic potential. Once inside the cochlea, cisplatin has been proposed to cause cellular toxicity through a number of different mechanisms, including through the production of reactive oxygen species. The decreased incidence of oxaliplatin ototoxicity has been attributed to decreased uptake of the drug by cells of the cochlea. Administration of amifostine has been used in attempts to prevent cisplatin-induced ototoxicity, but the American Society of Clinical Oncology recommends against its routine use.

The vinca alkaloids, including vincristine, are also associated with reversible ototoxicity.

Antiseptics and disinfectants

Topical skin preparations such as chlorhexidine and ethyl alcohol have the potential to be ototoxic should they enter the inner ear through the round window membrane. This potential was first noted after a small percentage of patients undergoing early myringoplasty operations experienced severe sensorineural hearing loss. It was found that in all operations involving this complication the preoperative sterilization was done with chlorhexidine. The ototoxicity of chlorhexidine was further confirmed by studies with animal models.

Several other skin preparations have been shown to be potentially ototoxic in the animal model. These preparations include acetic acid, propylene glycol, quaternary ammonium compounds, and any alcohol-based preparations. However, it is difficult to extrapolate these results to human ototoxicity because the human round window membrane is much thicker than in any animal model.

Other medicinal ototoxic drugs
At high doses, quinine, aspirin and other salicylates may also cause high-pitch tinnitus and hearing loss in both ears, typically reversible upon discontinuation of the drug. Erectile dysfunction medications may have the potential to cause hearing loss. However the link between erectile dysfunction medications and hearing loss remains uncertain.

Previous noise exposure has not been found to potentiate ototoxic hearing loss. The American Academy of Audiology includes in their position statement that exposure to noise at the same time as aminoglycosides may exacerbate ototoxicity. The American Academy of Audiology recommends people being treated with ototoxic chemotherapeutics avoid excessive noise levels during treatment and for several months following cessation of treatment. Opiates in combination with excessive noise levels may also have an additive effect on ototoxic hearing loss.

Ototoxicants in the environment and workplace 
Ototoxic effects are also seen with quinine, pesticides, solvents, asphyxiants, and heavy metals such as mercury and lead. When combining multiple ototoxicants, the risk of hearing loss becomes greater. As these exposures are common, this hearing impairment can affect many occupations and industries.  Examples of activities that often have exposures to both noise and solvents include:

 Printing
 Painting
 Construction
 Fueling vehicles and aircraft
 Firefighting
 Weapons firing
 Pesticide spraying

Ototoxic chemicals in the environment (from contaminated air or water) or in the workplace interact with mechanical stresses on the hair cells of the cochlea in different ways. For mixtures containing organic solvents such as toluene, styrene or xylene, the combined exposure with noise increases the risk of occupational hearing loss in a synergistic manner. The risk is greatest when the co-exposure is with impulse noise. Carbon monoxide has been shown to increase the severity of the hearing loss from noise. Given the potential for enhanced risk of hearing loss, exposures and contact with products such as fuels, paint thinners, degreasers, white spirits, exhaust, should be kept to a minimum. Noise exposures should be kept below 85 decibels, and the chemical exposures should be below the recommended exposure limits given by regulatory agencies.

Drug exposures mixed with noise potentially lead to increased risk of ototoxic hearing loss. Noise exposure combined with the chemotherapeutic cisplatin puts individuals at increased risk of ototoxic hearing loss. Noise at 85 dB SPL or above added to the amount of hair cell death in the high frequency region of the cochlea in chinchillas.

The hearing loss caused by chemicals can be very similar to a hearing loss caused by excessive noise.  A 2018 informational bulletin by the US Occupational Safety and Health Administration (OSHA) and the National Institute for Occupational Safety and Health (NIOSH) introduces the issue, provides examples of ototoxic chemicals, lists the industries and occupations at risk and provides prevention information.

Treatment
No specific treatment may be available, but withdrawal of the ototoxic drug may be warranted when the consequences of doing so are less severe than those of the ototoxicity. Co-administration of anti-oxidants may limit the ototoxic effects.

Ototoxic monitoring during exposure is recommended by the American Academy of Audiology to allow for proper detection and possible prevention or rehabilitation of the hearing loss through a cochlear implant or hearing aid. Monitoring can be completed through performing otoacoustic emissions testing or high frequency audiometry. Successful monitoring includes a baseline test before, or soon after, exposure to the ototoxicant. Follow-up testing is completed in increments after the first exposure, throughout the cessation of treatment. Shifts in hearing status are monitored and relayed to the prescribing physician to make treatment decisions.

It is difficult to distinguish between nerve damage and structural damage due to similarity of the symptoms.  Diagnosis of ototoxicity typically results from ruling out all other possible sources of hearing loss and is often the catchall explanation for the symptoms. Treatment options vary depending on the patient and the diagnosis. Some patients experience only temporary symptoms that do not require drastic treatment while others can be treated with medication. Physical therapy may prove useful for regaining balance and walking abilities. Cochlear implants are sometimes an option to restore hearing. Such treatments are typically taken to comfort the patient, not to cure the disease or damage caused by ototoxicity. There is no cure or restoration capability if the damage becomes permanent, although cochlear nerve terminal regeneration has been observed in chickens, which suggests that there may be a way to accomplish this in humans.

References

External links 

 OSHA-NIOSH 2018. Preventing Hearing Loss Caused by Chemical (Ototoxicity) and Noise Exposure Safety and Health Information Bulletin (SHIB), Occupational Safety and Health Administration and the National Institute for Occupational Safety and Health.  SHIB 03-08-2018. DHHS (NIOSH) Publication No. 2018-124. https://doi.org/10.26616/NIOSHPUB2018124
The Ear Poisons, The Synergist, American Industrial Hygiene Association, 2018.
World Report on Hearing, World Health Organization, 2021.
International Ototoxicity Management Group.

 
Hearing loss
Occupational safety and health